Mordellistena dahomeyensis is a beetle in the genus Mordellistena of the family Mordellidae. It was described in 1952 by Píc.

References

dahomeyensis
Beetles described in 1952